The 26th Annual South African Music Awards were held on 3–7 August 2020. Unlike previous years shows, the ceremony was broadcast as a five-night event, with the first four episodes being 30 minutes long, while the fifth one was a 45-minute grand finale. It was held virtually due to the effects of COVID-19 lockdowns, and for the first time, the award show was to be broadcast live on Multichoice's Mzansi Magic Channel (the award show was originally broadcast on SABC 1, but due to the channel's financial problems it was cancelled, then it was picked up by Multichoice). This was the first year the show was broadcast live via My Muze by Vodacom.

The award show was originally scheduled to take place on 2 June, in Sun City Arena, North West and was to air live. The nominees were announced on July 9, 2020.

Winners and nominees
Nominees are as listed below. Winners are in bold.

Best Produced Music Video
DJ Maphorisa, MFR Souls, Vigro Deep & Kabza De Small - Scorpion Kings

Music Video of the Year
K.O - Supa Dupa
Nasty C - SMA
Prince Kaybee - Fetch your life
Simmy - Umahlalela
Tellaman - Whipped
TNS - My Dali
Prince Kaybee - Gugulethu
Kwesta - Khethile Khethile
Black Motion - Joy Joy
Holly Rey - You
AKA - Jika
K.O - Say U Will
Mobi Dixon - Abantu
DJ Maphorisa & Kabza De Small - Koko
TLT - Mai Zuzu
Lady Zamar - This Is Love
DJ Sumbody - Ngwana Daddy
Zero12Finest - Baby Are You Coming?
MFR Souls - Love You Tonight
DJ Zinhle - Umlilo

Special Awards

International Achievement Award
 Ndlovu Youth Choir

Lifetime Achievement Award
 Dan Tshanda
 Benjamin Dube
Music Video of the Year
AKA featuring Yanga Chief - Jika

References

2020 music awards
South African Music Awards